Radio City Playhouse was a live half-hour anthology series that aired on NBC Radio from July 3, 1948 to January 1, 1950. Directed by Harry W. Junkin, with music by Dr. Roy Shield, and announcers Bob Warren (1948–49) and Fred Collins (1949–50), the series presented original radio dramas regardless of the fame of the author, so long as they were considered 'good'. Many of the broadcasts have survived and can be heard on websites specializing in old-time radio.

References 

 Old Time Radio: Radio City Playhouse 

1940s American radio programs
1950s American radio programs
1948 radio programme debuts
1950 radio programme endings
American radio dramas
Anthology radio series
NBC radio programs